The 1927 Primera División was the 12th season of top-flight Peruvian football. A total of 8 teams competed in the league, with Sport Progreso as defending champion. Alianza Lima won its third Primera División title. Many matches were not played.

Changes from 1926

Structural changes
For the 1927 season, 8 teams played in the league, a 3-team reduction from the previous season. No relegation took place in this season.

Promotion and relegation
Jorge Chavez No. 1, Teniente Ruiz, Nacional, Jorge Washington and Sport Jose Galvez were relegated. They were replaced by Ciclista Lima and Asociación Alianza.

Results

Standings

Round 1

Round 2

Round 3

External links
Peru 1927 season at RSSSF
Peruvian Football League News 

Peru
1927
1927 in Peruvian football